The Lonelyhearts Kid is a British television sitcom which was first broadcast on ITV in 1984. Produced by Thames Television, it consisted of one series of six half-hour episodes. After breaking up with his girlfriend Judy, Ken tries to find a new woman in his life.

Actors who appeared in individual episodes include Christopher Ellison, Paul Chapman, Debbie Farrington, Norman Mitchell,  James Bree and Ray Winstone.

Main cast
 Robert Glenister as Ken (6 episodes)
 George Winter as Ray (6 episodes)
 Julia Goodman as Ros (6 episodes)
 Debbie Farrington as Judy (2 episodes)

References

Bibliography
 Christopher Perry. The British Television Pilot Episodes Research Guide 1936-2015. 2015.

External links
 

ITV sitcoms
1984 British television series debuts
1984 British television series endings
1980s British comedy television series
English-language television shows
Television shows produced by Thames Television